Pier Crescenzi may refer to:

Pietro de' Crescenzi, Pietro (Pier) Crescenzi (ca. 1230/35-ca. 1320), Italian jurist and writer on agriculture
Pier Paolo Crescenzi (1572–1645), Italian Catholic cardinal